Grech is a surname of Maltese origin. Notable people with the surname include:
 Godwin Grech, Australian Treasury official involved in the OzCar affair
 Joe Grech (born 1934), Maltese singer
 Joe Debono Grech (born 1939), Maltese politician
 Joseph Grech (1948–2010), Maltese bishop of Sandhurst
 Karin Grech (1962–1977), Maltese murder victim
 Leandro Grech (born 1980), Maltese football player
 Lino Grech (1930−2013), Maltese actor, writer and director
 Louis Grech (born 1947), Maltese politician
 Mario Grech (born 1947), Maltese bishop, cardinal and Vatican official
 Martin Grech (born 1982), English musician
 Prosper Grech (1925–2019), Maltese Roman Catholic bishop and cardinal
 Ric Grech (1946–1990), English bassist

See also 
 Krech

Maltese-language surnames